Pentelow is a surname. Notable people with the surname include:

 Arthur Pentelow (1924–1991), English actor
 Kylie Pentelow (born 1979), English journalist and television news presenter